William John Sinclair (1877–1935) was a geologist and vertebrate paleontologist, noteworthy for his collaboration with Walter W. Granger on stratigraphy in New Mexico and Wyoming.

Sinclair received in 1904 his M.S. and Ph.D. from U. C. Berkeley, where John C. Merriam was his doctoral supervisor. After receiving his Ph.D., Sinclair went to Princeton University as a Teaching Fellow and was promoted in 1905 to Instructor in Geology, in 1916 to Assistant Professor, in 1928 to Associate Professor, and in 1930 to Professor.

Sinclair was a protégé of William B. Scott and secured funding for Princeton's William Berryman Scott Fund for research in vertebrate paleontology. Sinclair willed his large petroleum-derived estate to establish Princeton's Sinclair Professorship of Vertebrate Paleontology. The first holder of this professorship was Glenn Lowell Jepsen (1903–1974).

See also
Bighorn Basin Dinosaur Project

References

External links

1877 births
1935 deaths
University of California, Berkeley alumni
Princeton University faculty
American paleontologists
American geologists